Club Deportivo Tiburones Rojos de Veracruz Premier  was a professional football team that played in the Mexican Football League. They played in the Liga Premier (Mexico's Second Division). Tiburones Rojos de Veracruz Premier was affiliated with Tiburones Rojos de Veracruz who plays in the Liga MX. The games were held in Veracruz City in the CAR Veracruz.

Players

Current squad 

2015 establishments in Mexico
Football clubs in Veracruz
Liga Premier de México